Yuri Karenovich Udunyan (born 25 August 1994) is a Russian football player.

Club career
He made his professional debut in the Russian Professional Football League for FC Anzhi-2 Makhachkala on 12 August 2014 in a game against FC Alania Vladikavkaz. He made his Russian Football National League debut for FC Anzhi Makhachkala on 30 May 2015 in a game against FC Sakhalin Yuzhno-Sakhalinsk and scored on his second-tier debut.

References

External links
 

1994 births
Living people
Russian people of Armenian descent
Footballers from Makhachkala
Russian footballers
Association football defenders
FC Anzhi Makhachkala players
FC Khimik Dzerzhinsk players
FC Veles Moscow players